Pioneer Mountain may refer to:

 Pioneer Mountain (Arizona) in Arizona, USA
 Pioneer Mountain (California) in California, USA
 Pioneer Mountain (Idaho) in Idaho, USA
 Pioneer Mountain (Montana) in Montana, USA
 Pioneer Mountain (Oregon) in Oregon, USA, near Toledo, Oregon; 

See also: Pioneer Mountains (disambiguation)